Parliamentary Under-Secretary of State (or just Parliamentary Secretary, particularly in departments not led by a Secretary of State) is the lowest of three tiers of government minister in the UK government, immediately junior to a Minister of State, which is itself junior to a Secretary of State.

Background 
The Ministerial and Other Salaries Act 1975 provides that at any one time there can be no more than 83 paid ministers (not counting the Lord Chancellor, up to 3 law officers and up to 22 whips). Of these, no more than 50 ministers can be paid the salary of a minister senior to a Parliamentary Secretary. Thus if 50 senior ministers are appointed, the maximum number of paid Parliamentary Secretaries is 33.

The limit on the number of unpaid Parliamentary Secretaries is given by the House of Commons Disqualification Act 1975 ensuring that no more than 95 government ministers of any kind can sit in the House of Commons at any one time; there is no upper bound to the number of unpaid ministers sitting in the House of Lords.

The position should neither be confused with the Permanent Secretary which is the most senior civil servant in a government department (also known as the Permanent Under-Secretary of State), nor with a Parliamentary Private Secretary (an MP serving as an assistant to a minister entitled to directly relevant expenses but no further pay).

Of his tenure as an under-secretary in Macmillan's 1957–1963 Conservative government from the Lords, the Duke of Devonshire noted: "No one who hasn't been a Parliamentary Under Secretary of State has any conception of how unimportant a Parliamentary Under Secretary of State is".

Current Parliamentary Under-Secretaries of State 
The current Parliamentary Under-Secretaries of State are:

 HM Treasury
Economic Secretary to the Treasury
Exchequer Secretary to the Treasury
Foreign, Commonwealth and Development Office (see Under-Secretary of State for Foreign Affairs)
Parliamentary Under-Secretary of State for Africa
Parliamentary Under-Secretary of State for European Neighbourhood and the Americas
Home Office (see Under-Secretary of State for the Home Department)
Parliamentary Under-Secretary of State for Safeguarding
Parliamentary Under-Secretary of State for Immigration and Future Borders
Parliamentary Under-Secretary of State for Immigration Compliance and Courts (joint with Ministry of Justice)
Cabinet Office
Parliamentary Secretary (Minister for Implementation)
Parliamentary Under-Secretary of State for Defence People and Veterans
Ministry of Justice
Parliamentary Under-Secretary of State for Justice
Parliamentary Under-Secretary of State
Parliamentary Under-Secretary of State for Immigration Compliance and the Courts (joint with Home Office)
Ministry of Defence
Parliamentary Under-Secretary of State for the Armed Forces
Parliamentary Under-Secretary of State for Defence People and Veterans
Department of Health and Social Care
Parliamentary Under-Secretary of State for Technology, Innovation and Life Sciences
Parliamentary Under-Secretary of State for Vaccines and Public Health
Parliamentary Under-Secretary of State for Patient Safety and Primary Care
Department for Business, Energy and Industrial Strategy
Parliamentary Under-Secretary of State for Business and Industry
Parliamentary Under-Secretary of State for Science, Research and Innovation
Parliamentary Under-Secretary of State for Small Business, Consumers and Labour Markets
Parliamentary Under-Secretary of State for Climate Change and Corporate Responsibility
Department for International Trade
Parliamentary Under-Secretary of State for Exports (joint with UK Export Finance)
Parliamentary Under-Secretary of State for International Trade
Parliamentary Under-Secretary of State for Equalities
Parliamentary Under-Secretary of State for Women
Department for Work and Pensions
Parliamentary Under-Secretary of State for Employment
Parliamentary Under-Secretary of State for Pensions and Financial Inclusion
Parliamentary Under-Secretary of State for Welfare Delivery
Parliamentary Under-Secretary of State for Work and Pensions
Department for Education
Parliamentary Under-Secretary of State for Children and Families
Parliamentary Under-Secretary of State for Apprenticeships and Skills
Parliamentary Under-Secretary of State for the School System
Department for Environment, Food and Rural Affairs
Parliamentary Under-Secretary of State for Farming, Fisheries and Food
Parliamentary Under-Secretary of State for Rural Affairs and Biosecurity
Parliamentary Under-Secretary of State
Ministry of Housing, Communities and Local Government
Parliamentary Under-Secretary of State for Housing and Rough Sleeping
Parliamentary Under-Secretary of State for Faith and Communities
Department for Transport
Parliamentary Under-Secretary of State
Parliamentary Under-Secretary of State
Parliamentary Under-Secretary of State
Office of the Secretary of State for Scotland
Parliamentary Under-Secretary of State for Scotland
Parliamentary Under-Secretary of State
Office of the Secretary of State for Wales
Parliamentary Under-Secretary of State for Wales
Department for Digital, Culture, Media and Sport
Parliamentary Under-Secretary of State for Digital Infrastructure
Parliamentary Under-Secretary of State for Sport, Tourism and Heritage
Parliamentary Secretary (Minister for Civil Society)

UK Export Finance
Parliamentary Under-Secretary of State for Exports (joint with Department for International Trade)

Historic Parliamentary Under-Secretaries of State 
Department for Exiting the European Union
Parliamentary Under-Secretary of State for Exiting the European Union
Department of Health and Social Care
Parliamentary Secretary to the Ministry of Health
Technology
Parliamentary Secretary, Ministry of Technology
Foreign affairs and Defence
Under-Secretary of State for Air
Under-Secretary of State for Commonwealth Affairs
Under-Secretary of State for Commonwealth Relations
Under-Secretary of State for Dominion Affairs
Under-Secretary of State for India
Under-Secretary of State for War
Under-Secretary of State for the Colonies
Under-Secretary of State for War and the Colonies

See also 

 Parliamentary secretary
 Permanent secretary
 Private secretary
Undersecretary

References

Ministerial positions in the Government of the United Kingdom